Jeffrey Dexter Boomhauer III (born April 7, 1953), most commonly referred to as Boomhauer is a fictional character in the Fox animated series King of the Hill, voiced by series creator Mike Judge, known for his fast-paced and nearly-incomprehensible speech.

Character overview
Boomhauer is the high school friend and neighbor of the characters Hank Hill, Bill Dauterive, and Dale Gribble. His first name was only spoken in the TV series during the season 13 episode, "Uh-Oh, Canada", when the Canadian woman with whom he'd switched houses for the summer said, "Hello, Jeff. Oh my, it's the fifteenth already?" His driver's license as shown in the series finale reads "Boomhauer, Jeff" and reveals that he is 6'0".

The location of Boomhauer's house is inconsistent during the series. In the series finale, his address is shown on his driver's license as 73 Rainey Street, which would place him on the same side of the alley as Hank, Dale, and Kahn Souphanousinphone. However, in "Uh-oh, Canada", the rear of Boomhauer's house is shown to be across the alley from Dale's house, diagonally across to the right from Hank's back yard, which would place the front door of his house (and its address) on another street.

Boomhauer's primary pursuits are fast cars and women. He currently drives a 1969 Dodge Coronet Super Bee; in high school, he drove a late-'60s Ford Mustang nicknamed "Ms. Sally," the name being a reference to the classic Wilson Pickett song "Mustang Sally", until the car was accidentally driven into the Arlen quarry by Dale, Hank, and Bill while playing a prank on him (Dale did not know how to drive a manual car and confused the clutch for the brake pedal).

Boomhauer spends most of his spare time drinking Alamo Beer with Hank, Dale, and Bill in the alley behind Hank's house. While he enjoys his friendship with Hank, he sometimes has limited patience with Dale (whom he sharply refers to as "Gribble") and considers Bill "boring" due to his inferiority complex. Boomhauer favors animal-print bikini briefs, which have been observed a few times in the show when he's appeared without his blue jeans; he tends to overuse cologne, bragging about his Calvin Klein CK1 attracting women "like catnip". Boomhauer is a strict non-smoker who carries a lighter implicitly for emergencies or for lending.

In one episode where Hank, Bill, Dale, and Boomhauer are stuck in the water because they jumped off a boat, Boomhauer states that he dyes his hair ("Hank's on Board"). According to his Texas driver's license, which is seen in the series finale, Boomhauer is 6’0” (183 cm), and 185 lbs., and has hazel eyes. Boomhauer is missing his left pinky toe, due to an accident while he was in the Order of the Straight Arrow ("Straight as an Arrow").

Boomhauer is apparently highly astute and often gives advice to his friends. He is also a frequent voice of truth, owning up to the wrongdoings of the group despite not always acting appropriately himself.  Although, since his speech pattern is not understood by most people, his confessions are usually ignored. In the episode "A Firefighting We Will Go", after Hank blames the deceased Chet Elderson for causing the fire station to burn down, Boomhauer points out that Dale was the one who plugged in the malfunctioning Alamo Beer sign. However, the fire chief does not seem to understand him and decides that the blame for the fire will be placed on electrical problems, in order to leave the integrity of Chet Elderson's name intact.

In another episode, he mentions that his mother wanted him to become an electrical engineer. Given the opportunity, Boomhauer will demonstrate that he is, in fact, quite cultured. In "Ceci N'Est Pas Une King of the Hill", Hank makes remarks about art that deride its modern state, provoking Boomhauer to call him ignorant, going so far as to cite Dadaism and the famed Marcel Duchamp work Fountain.  He is the only character who initially understood the meaning behind Kahn's story at Buckley's funeral, and the symbolic meanings of the novel Dinner of Onions in "Full Metal Dust Jacket".

Three of the main characters (Hank, Dale, and Boomhauer) graduated from high school together (Bill did not complete his senior year, having enlisted in the United States Army). Boomhauer was the starting quarterback for the football team, while Hank was a running back, and Bill was an offensive lineman and a fullback. Dale, not being as athletic as his friends, was the towel manager. Dale referred to basketball legend Wilt Chamberlain as Boomhauer's idol in the season 11 episode "serPUNt". According to Hank, Boomhauer is allergic to macadamia nuts. Boomhauer is the most modern of the four friends, and as such was first to own a cell phone.

Occupation
Boomhauer's occupation is unclear throughout the series. Season 13 episode 20, "To Sirloin with Love," reveals that Boomhauer has a Texas Ranger badge in his wallet (though whether or not this is legitimate is never stated).  In season  3 episode 7, "Nine Pretty Darn Angry Men", Boomhauer, when asked about his employment during a lawnmower focus group, claims he’s “done a lot of different things,” and mentions something about receiving a tax-free worker's compensation settlement. It’s possible that this was a cover, or that he was in a different line of work prior to becoming a Texas Ranger. In the season 5 episode, Luanne Virgin 2.0, Hank says he is going to borrow Boomhauer's limousine, but it is not explained if Boomhauer uses the limousine as a source of income or not.

Trademark speech pattern
Boomhauer's speech patterns are nearly incomprehensible to an unfamiliar audience and serve as a recurring theme. He mumbles, usually quite fast, and invariably uses the words "dang ol'" as an all-purpose adjective, sometimes several times in a single sentence. He also uses the phrases "I tell ya what" and "man" frequently. His heavy Southern accent and stuttering delivery sometimes leads to misunderstandings about his mental capacity; it has been made clear that he is an intelligent and sensitive person who expresses that in an inimitable way, such as a memorable occasion where the group's anger at Bill leads to Hank finding out he has the word "Bill" tattooed on his head, and Boomhauer chuckles as he says "life will throw you dang ol' curveball man, like dang ol' Sandy Koufax" (a reference to the legendary Hall of Fame pitcher who was known for the unhittable pitch Boomhauer described). In the fourth-season episode "Naked Ambition", he was admitted to a mental hospital in downtown Houston after he drifted in on the river in a tube and was found in his Speedo, sunburned, drunk, and dehydrated, while his speech pattern was misinterpreted by a police officer as incoherent babbling (in this same episode, he is seen painting a self-portrait in a highly accurate rendition of the style of Vincent van Gogh). All of the regular characters on the show understand most of what he says. In one such instance, when a furious Dale has become involved in a dangerous situation in the episode "Dog Dale Afternoon" and Boomhauer begs him via megaphone to surrender, Dale snaps "Boomhauer, if I ever heard anyone reading a script, that was it."

There is a recurring joke in which Hank occasionally cannot understand Boomhauer due to extenuating circumstances such as the complexity of the vocabulary being used (i.e., "legalese mumbo jumbo"), a bad telephone connection, or an echo. In one Rashomon-style episode, "A Firefighting We Will Go", it is implied that Boomhauer's speech sounds perfectly ordinary for his region in his own memory  contrary to how everyone else hears him  this being cited as "evidence of bidialectism". Often, the closed caption texts of Boomhauer's mumblings are clearer than his spoken words. An example of a typical line of dialogue:

Boomhauer's speech is satirical of "rednecks" using phrases such as "dang ol'", "dad gum" and "yeah, man talkin' 'bout" and has the cadence and style of a Cajun accent. Nevertheless, he sings clearly, as evidenced by his rendition of "Blue Moon of Kentucky" in Episode 113 ("The Bluegrass Is Always Greener"); this same episode reveals that he also has a talent for the banjo and the accordion. The singing was done by country star Vince Gill. Mike Judge has stated that the inspiration for Boomhauer's voice came from a message left on his answering machine by an irate viewer of Beavis and Butt-Head (who assumed the show was called Porky’s Butthole) as well as the voice patterns of an acquaintance in Dallas and an Oklahoma City resident reciting directions over the telephone.

The season 1 episode "Hank's Got the Willies" shows Boomhauer and the famously incomprehensible Bob Dylan conversing with one another. In "A Fire Fighting We Will Go", when a story is presented from Boomhauer's point of view, he speaks clearly while the other characters have his usual speech pattern, indicating that Boomhauer sees his speech as normal and that of his associates as difficult to understand.

Early promotional spots for the series featured clips of Boomhauer speaking, intercut with text that presented the term "Boombonics" in the style of a dictionary entry, as a reference to "Ebonics" (AAVE). The word was broken down into syllables, with proper pronunciation and the definition (see gibberish).

Although he only mumbles when speaking English, he is fluent in both Spanish and French.

Family
Boomhauer has had four relatives that have appeared on the show: his "Meemaw" (a Southern term for grandmother); his father, Dr. Boomhauer; his mother, Mrs. Boomhauer; and his sleazy, womanizer brother, Patch, voiced by Brad Pitt in his only speaking appearance (he appeared again for a split second at Luanne and Lucky's wedding). They live in Florida. Mrs. Boomhauer, Patch, and Meemaw all have the same speaking pattern as Boomhauer. Dr. Boomhauer has not been shown speaking, only through other characters paraphrasing what he may have said. He is the uncle of Patch's son, Patrick Boomhauer.

Romantic life
Boomhauer's typical romantic life included one-night stands with several young women. Peggy Hill once mentions (likely in jest) his longest relationship was a three-day weekend. Occasionally, he had girlfriends that he dated for more than sex. When a woman breaks up with him in "Dang Ol' Love," he is notably devastated. In the episode "Uh-Oh, Canada", Boomhauer moves to Guelph, Ontario, and has a 3-month relationship with a French-Canadian woman.

When demonstrating his abilities as a pick-up artist to Bobby, he was shown to lurk in a discount shoe store and hit on every woman he sees, receiving close to two dozen rejections before getting a single yes, suggesting that his luck with women comes from his persistence and lack of shame rather than any real charm.

References

External links

FOX Broadcasting Company: King of the Hill

King of the Hill characters
Television characters introduced in 1997
Animated characters introduced in 1997
Fictional players of American football
Fictional characters of the Texas Ranger Division
Male characters in animated series